The 2020–21 Currie Cup Premier Division was the 82nd edition of the top tier of the Currie Cup, the premier domestic rugby union competition in South Africa. It was sponsored by beer brand Carling Black Label and organised by the South African Rugby Union.

Traditionally played in winter, the Currie Cup began later than usual in the 2020 season due to the COVID-19 pandemic, and extended into summer. The tournament was scheduled to start in late August, subject to government approval, but no rugby was allowed to be played in South Africa between mid March and late September 2020.

To satisfy commercial partners, a combined Currie Cup and domestic Super Rugby Unlocked tournament was created for the seven Premier Division teams. It was played over 16 weeks with all regular season matches counting towards one combined log of the team's standings. The Super Rugby Unlocked competition began in October and was played as a seven-week round-robin. All tournament points were then carried forward to the Currie Cup Premier Division, played from November 2020 to January 2021 and incorporating a return round-robin of matches followed by cup playoffs.

There was no First Division of the Currie Cup played in 2020. It was provisionally scheduled to be played in June and July, but was cancelled due to financial stress caused by the COVID-19 pandemic.

Teams

The seven competing teams were:

Regular season

Format
The Currie Cup Premier Division competition began with a seven-week round-robin stage. Each team started with the log points from the final position of their union in the Super Rugby Unlocked competition that was played over the preceding seven weeks. The top four teams on the combined standings log at the end of the regular season qualified for the semifinals, which was followed by a final.

Tournament points in the standings were awarded to teams as follows:
 4 points for a win.
 2 points for a draw. 
 1 bonus point for a loss in a match by seven points or under. 
 1 bonus point for scoring three tries more than the opponent.

Teams were ranked in the standings firstly by tournament points then by: (a) points difference from all matches (points scored less points conceded); (b) tries difference from all matches (tries scored less tries conceded); (c) points difference from the matches between the tied teams; (d) points scored in all matches; (e) tries scored in all matches; and, if needed, (f) a coin toss.

Standings
Combined log of the regular season Currie Cup and Super Rugby Unlocked matches:

Round-by-round
The table below shows the progression of all teams throughout the Currie Cup season. Each team's tournament points on the standings log is shown for each round, with the overall log position in brackets.

All teams started with the log points carried over from their union's final position in the Super Rugby Unlocked competition.

Matches

For the first half of the provincial season, a round-robin of matches was played for Super Rugby Unlocked honours, with all tournament points  carried forward to the Premier Division of the Currie Cup.

Listed below are all matches for the return round-robin, played for the 2020–21 Currie Cup Premier Division.

Round 1

Round 2

Round 3

Round 4

Round 5

Round 6

Round 7

Play-offs
The play-off matches were rescheduled for a week later than previously planned to observe COVID-19 isolation protocols and maintain tournament integrity for the competing teams.

Semifinals

Final

Players

Player Statistics

Team rosters

The respective team squads for the 2020–21 Currie Cup Premier Division were:

Referees
The following referees officiated matches in the competition:

See also
 Super Rugby Unlocked

Notes

References

External links
 SARU website

2020 Currie Cup
2020
Currie Cup 2020
Currie Cup 2020
Currie Cup 2020
Currie Cup 2020
Currie Cup 2020